Notagonum inerme is a species of ground beetle in the subfamily Platyninae. It was described by Andrewes in 1937.

References

Notagonum
Beetles described in 1937
Taxa named by Herbert Edward Andrewes